The Girl of the Uchter Moor, also known as Moora, is the name given to a female Iron Age bog body discovered in 2000 in marshland near Uchte, Germany. The remains include vertebrae, hair and skull pieces. The studies of the body began in 2005. The radiocarbon dating performed at the University of Kiel showed that Moora had died between 764 and 515 BCE. Despite common Iron Age burial practices, the body was not cremated. All of the body parts are estimated to have been found except for one scapula. 

Before DNA analysis and radiocarbon dating, the body was initially believed to be that of a sixteen-year-old girl, Elke Kerll, who had disappeared in 1969 after going to a dance club.

Analysis
Moora was determined to be between 17 and 19 years old at the time of her death. She was left-handed. The analysis of Moora's skeleton revealed she had likely experienced intense physical labour in her lifetime, likely repeatedly carrying heavy loads such as water jugs, while roaming through the marshland. According to Saring Dennis from the University Hospital Hamburg-Eppendorf, Moora had sustained at least two partial skull fractures in her lifetime, both of which had gradually healed in time. Moora had also suffered long periods of sickness associated with the hardships of long winters. The bone growth lines revealed that, during her childhood and adolescence, Moora suffered from chronic malnutrition. Moora was also diagnosed to have a benign tumor at the base of her skull, which led to the spine curvature and chronic inflammation in the leg bones. However, Moora's cause of death is unknown. It was only determined that Moora was naked at the time she was deposited into the bog.

Facial reconstructions
Moora's face has been reconstructed a number of times. The two that were created in the traditional way were built by molding material over a plastic replica of the skull. The artist had to estimate the shape of the girl's lips, hair color and skin tones, similar to the process of the Yde Girl.

References

External links

Computer-aided reconstruction of the bog body "Moora"

2000 archaeological discoveries
5th-century BC births
6th-century BC births
7th-century BC births
5th-century BC deaths
6th-century BC deaths
7th-century BC deaths
Archaeology of Lower Saxony
Bog bodies
Iron Age Germany